Decoding Deepak is a 2012 feature-length documentary film directed by Gotham Chopra about his father Deepak Chopra. It was released in the United States in theaters, on video on demand and digital platforms, on October 5, 2012. It was distributed by SnagFilms, a digital distributor of independent films.

The film is dedicated to David Simon M.D. (1951-2012), close friend of the Chopra family who died of a brain tumor on January 31, 2012.

References

External links
 
 
 Credits at NYTimes Movies
 John DeFore, Hollywood Reporter (March 31, 2012)
 Joe Leydon, Variety (March 26, 2012)
 Tom Roston, "Filmmaker Sets Focus Very Close to Home", New York Times (September 30, 2012)
 Gotham Deepak blog entry Huffington Post (October 5, 2012)

2012 films
American documentary films
2012 documentary films
Biographical documentary films
2010s English-language films
2010s American films